Walt Disney Studios may refer to:
 Walt Disney Studio (1926–1929) the second name of The Walt Disney Company
 Walt Disney Studios (division), the Walt Disney Company's Studio Entertainment unit, which includes Disney's motion picture studios, music labels, theatrical production company, and distribution companies.
 Walt Disney Studios (Burbank), complex in Burbank, California, built in 1939, which serves as the corporate headquarters for The Walt Disney Company. It is also a functioning film studio and hosts production facilities for Disney's various entertainment businesses
 Walt Disney Animation Studios, the company's main animation division. Animated films are released under the Walt Disney Pictures label
 Walt Disney Studios Motion Pictures, the primary theatrical film distributor of Disney films in the United States and abroad
 Walt Disney Studios Home Entertainment, the primary home media distributor of Disney films in the United States and abroad
 Walt Disney Television Studios, a grouping of Walt Disney Television's production companies

See also
 Disney Interactive Studios, they produce and release video games for The Walt Disney Company
 Walt Disney Studios Park, a theme park in Marne-la-Vallée, France opened in 2002. Part of the Disneyland Paris resort
 Disney's Hollywood Studios, a theme park at the Walt Disney World Resort in Lake Buena Vista, Florida